Limberg may refer to:

 Limberg is a village of the municipality Maissau, a town in the district of Hollabrunn in Lower Austria, Austria.
 Limberg bei Wies, municipality in the district of Deutschlandsberg in Styria, Austria.
 Limberg (grape), another name for the wine grape Blaufrankisch
 Limberg (Wiehen Hills), a hill in the Wiehen Hills, Germany, and site of Limberg Castle

People
 Limberg Chero Ballena, professor from Perú 
 Limberg Gutiérrez (b. 1977), Bolivian football (soccer) player 
 Limberg Méndez (b. 1973), Bolivian football (soccer) player
 Kriemhild Limberg (born 1934), German discus thrower

See also
 Limberger (disambiguation)
 Limburg (disambiguation)